The Estadio El Hogar is a multi-use stadium in Matamoros, Mexico. It is currently used mostly for football matches and is the home stadium for Gavilanes de Matamoros. With a capacity of 22,000 people, it was the fourth largest stadium in northeastern Mexico at the time of its completion, behind only top-flight grounds.

It includes 4,000 parking spots, a training center, a panoramic restaurant and artificial lighting.

History
The stadium was completed in time for the 2017–18 Liga Premier season, in which the Gavilanes were admitted to the third-tier league as an expansion team. On 19 August 2017, an inauguration ceremony was held before the team defeated Alacranes de Durango in their first Liga Premier home fixture with an attendance of about 16,000.

References

External links
Official website
Stadium at LigaMX

Estadio El Hogar
Sports venues in Tamaulipas
Athletics (track and field) venues in Mexico